Omar Alghabra  (born October 24, 1969) is a Canadian politician who has served as the minister of transport since January 2021. A member of the Liberal Party, he has represented the riding of Mississauga Centre in the House of Commons since the 2015 election. He was previously the member of Parliament (MP) for Mississauga—Erindale from 2006 to 2008.

Early life and education
Alghabra was born in Al-Khobar, Saudi Arabia to a Syrian family. His father, an architect, moved their family to Saudi Arabia in 1968. Alghabra has stated that he remembers living a sheltered life there, attending private school and visiting Syria in the summer. Alghabra completed his high school education at the Dhahran Ahliyya School in Alkhobar. He then moved to Damascus, Syria, where he started his engineering degree at Damascus University. He decided to complete his education in Canada.

Alghabra moved to Toronto when he was 19 years old to attend school. He attended grade 13 to obtain his Ontario high school diploma. Later, he completed his Bachelor of Engineering at Ryerson Polytechnical Institute.

Alghabra also attended York University, where he graduated with a Master of Business Administration.

Professional career 
Alghabra's first job was at Ainsworth Inc. as a quality assurance supervisor. He later transitioned to sales and worked as the predictive maintenance supervisor. Afterwards, he joined General Electric (GE) as a Six Sigma Black Belt in the industrial service business. He became the global business leader for GE's industrial refurbished parts business.

After his political defeat in the 2008 general election, Alghabra joined ENBALA Power Networks as their vice president for corporate development. Later, he worked as an advisor to the COO of the Ontario Energy Board on innovation in the utility sector. Alghabra returned to the Faculty of Engineering and Architectural Science after being appointed a distinguished visiting professor. In this role, he also joined Ryerson's start-up incubator DMZ as their executive-in-residence.

Alghabra was the president of the Canadian Arab Federation (CAF) in 2004–2005. After Alghabra left CAF, the group made controversial statements, and Alghabra condemned those statements.

Political career 
Alghabra first took office following the 2006 federal election to the 39th Parliament of Canada, then again in 2015 to the 42nd Parliament of Canada.

When a MP retired, Alghabra left General Electric to run as the Liberal candidate in the 2006 federal election in the riding of Mississauga—Erindale. He defeated Conservative candidate Bob Dechert by 3,328 votes. After that election there was a Conservative Party minority government, led by Stephen Harper. He was defeated in 2008, and then was elected again in 2015, and re-elected in 2019.

He served as parliament secretary to the minister of foreign affairs (consular affairs) from 2015 to 2018 and parliament secretary to the minister of international trade diversification from 2018 to 2019. Alghabra was re-elected in the 2019 federal election. He was appointed as parliament secretary to the prime minister (public service renewal) and parliament secretary to the deputy prime minister and minister of intergovernmental affairs. He was also sworn in as a member of the Privy Council in February 2020. In the Cabinet reshuffle on January 12, 2021, Alghabra became the transport minister, succeeding Marc Garneau.

Following a motion condemning Islamophobia amidst death threats to Muslim MPs, Alghabra stated that his primary concern was his staff who process these messages. He continued that it is important to have a conversation about Islamophobia and that he purposely does not delete comments received on his Facebook page. Alghabra attributes backlash against the motion to a campaign of misinformation and ignorance.

Backbencher

Consular affairs 
As Parliament Secretary, Alghabra had a consular affairs file that oversaw 250,000 cases. He worked on the cases on John Ridsdel, Joshua Boyle and helped assisting Canadians stranded by Hurricane Irma in the Caribbean.

Trade 
Alghabra was appointed Parliament Secretary to the Minister of International Trade Diversification and served from 2018 to 2019. Alghabra also served on the Standing Committee for International Trade.

Flight 752 
Alghabra was tasked with working directly with victims' families of the Ukrainian International Airlines Flight PS752. Alghabra stated that the government is offering legal assistance and exploring forms of interim compensation while they wait for proper compensation to be settled with Iran. Alghabra also announced that Ottawa will match funds raised during the Canada Strong campaign launched to raise $1.5 million for those who lost loved ones when the Ukrainian passenger plane was shot down by the Iranian military.

Minister of Transport
Alghabra became Minister of Transport on January 12, 2021, following the resignation of industry minister Navdeep Bains, resulting in a Cabinet shuffle.

Electoral record

References

External links

1969 births
Living people
Members of the House of Commons of Canada from Ontario
Members of the King's Privy Council for Canada
Liberal Party of Canada MPs
Canadian engineers
Canadian people of Syrian descent
Politicians from Mississauga
Syrian emigrants to Canada
Saudi Arabian emigrants to Canada
York University alumni
Toronto Metropolitan University alumni
21st-century Canadian politicians
Canadian politicians of Syrian descent
Canadian Ministers of Transport